Jack Downing (1 January 1920 – 11 July 1993) was a British sculptor. His work was part of the sculpture event in the art competition at the 1948 Summer Olympics.

References

1920 births
1993 deaths
20th-century British sculptors
20th-century British male artists
British male sculptors
Olympic competitors in art competitions
People from Bromsgrove